Galina Mauracher (born March 13, 1960 as Galina Viktorovna Krutikova,  in Leningrad), known professionally as Gal Rasché, is a Russian-Austrian pianist, music teacher and conductor.

Biography
Rasché is daughter of Viktor Krutikov (1930-1996), the longtime head of the Krasny Bor transmitter and Honored Communications Technician of the RSFSR and Valentina Krutikova (1930-2020).

Gal Rasché studied conducting at the St. Petersburg Conservatory. As a conductor, she performed works by Mozart, Schubert, Haydn and Tchaikovsky in concerts with the Viennarmonica Orchestra and the Vienna Metropolitan Chamber Orchestra in the Wiener Konzerthaus and in the Great Hall of the Musikverein.

Rasché was a prizewinner of the international artist competition Duc de Richelieu in the category author's book and musical original composition and interpretation in 2015 and 2018. She is a member of the RAO (Russian Authors' Society).

In 1996 she wrote the scenario for the ballet based on Anatoly Ivanov's transcription of the "Children's Album" by Pyotr Ilyich Tchaikovsky for percussion ensemble for which she won an award at the international festival in Yugoslavia.

She also held professorship for piano from 1998 - 2020 at the Prayner Conservatory in Vienna.

References

External links
 
 

1960 births
Living people
Musicians from Vienna
Musicians from Saint Petersburg
Russian pianists
Austrian conductors (music)
Austrian pianists
Women conductors (music)
21st-century Russian conductors (music)
21st-century Russian women musicians
20th-century Russian conductors (music)
20th-century Russian women musicians
Austrian music educators
Russian music educators
Saint Petersburg Conservatory alumni
20th-century women pianists
21st-century women pianists